David Summerhayes is a Welsh former professional footballer who played as a wing half.

Career
Summerhayes played in the English Football League for Cardiff City, before playing non-league football with Hereford United.

References

1940s births
Living people
Welsh footballers
Wales under-23 international footballers
Association football wing halves
Cardiff City F.C. players
Hereford United F.C. players
English Football League players